The Mason Cornwall House is located in Northern Idaho at 308 South Hayes Street in Moscow, Idaho.  The residence is a Victorian Italianate style house constructed of brick with a stucco finish. It is architecturally significant as one of the finest houses of its period in this area. The Cornwall house is listed on the National Register of Historic Places. It is currently used as a private dwelling.

Construction details
The stucco was applied to the brick in a technique that simulates cut stone. The house was built in 1889 by Lauder and Taylor, builders in the Moscow area. This house has other Italianate features including a hipped roof and first story round arch windows which are bordered by a band of molding all the way around the house. There are rusticated quoins located underneath the roof cornice. The  metal brackets under the eaves are handmade. The original roof was covered with interlocking metal shingles and had a small square structure with windows atop it. The shingles have since been replaced with red tile.

See also
 National Register of Historic Places listings in Latah County, Idaho

Notes

National Park Service

Houses in Latah County, Idaho
Houses on the National Register of Historic Places in Idaho
Buildings and structures in Moscow, Idaho
National Register of Historic Places in Latah County, Idaho
Houses completed in 1889
1889 establishments in Idaho Territory